Western Australian soccer clubs competed in 2015 for the Football West State Cup, known for sponsorship reasons as the Cool Ridge Cup. Clubs entered from the National Premier Leagues WA, the two divisions of the State League, a limited number of teams from various divisions of the 2015 Amateur League competition, and from regional teams invited from the South West, Goldfields, Great Southern and Midwest regions. This knockout competition was won by Sorrento FC, their third title.

The competition also served as the Western Australian Preliminary Rounds for the 2015 FFA Cup. The two finalists – Perth SC and Sorrento FC – qualified for the final rounds, entering at the Round of 32.

Schedule

A total of 61 teams took part in the competition, from Perth-based and regional-based competitions.

Second round
The round numbers conform to a common format throughout the 2015 FFA Cup preliminary rounds. A total of 23 teams took part in this stage of the competition, from lower divisions of the Amateur League, and from regional teams invited from the South West, Goldfields, Great Southern and Midwest regions. Matches in this round were played by 15 March 2015.

 Byes – Backpackers FC (8), Busselton SC, East Fremantle, Eaton Dardanup, Emerald FC, Maccabi SC (6), Perth Saints.

Third round
A total of 42 teams took part in this stage of the competition. The draw took place on 16 March, featuring the 15 Qualifiers from the first round, and 27 new teams that enter at this round: Football West State League Division 1 (8 teams), Football West State League Division 2 (10 teams), Amateur League Premier Division (9 teams). Matches in this round were played by 29 March.

Fourth round
A total of 32 teams took part in this stage of the competition. 11 of the 12 Clubs from the National Premier Leagues WA entered into the competition at this stage, with the exception of Perth Glory Youth who were not eligible. The draw took place on 30 March. Matches in this round were played on 6 April.

Fifth round
A total of 16 teams took part in this stage of the competition. The draw was held on 7 April. Matches in this round were played on 27 April.

Sixth round
A total of 8 teams took part in this stage of the competition. The draw took place on 28 April. Matches in this round were played on 1 June.

Seventh round
A total of 4 teams took part in this stage of the competition. The draw took place on 2 June. Matches in this round were played by 21 June. The two victorious teams in this round qualify for the 2015 FFA Cup Round of 32.

Final
The 2015 Cool Ridge Cup Final was played on 12 September, at the neutral venue of Inglewood Stadium.

Notes

References

Football West State Cup
WA State Challenge